Esquipulas del Norte is a municipality in the north west of the Honduran department of Olancho, east of Guata and north of Jano.

Demographics
At the time of the 2013 Honduras census, Esquipulas del Norte municipality had a population of 10,138. Of these, 98.75% were Mestizo, 0.78% White, 0.27% Indigenous and 0.21% Black or Afro-Honduran.

References

Municipalities of the Olancho Department